Bulle Rock (foaled c. 1709), sometimes referred to as Bulle Rocke or "Bullyrock", is thought to be the first Thoroughbred stallion brought to America.  He was imported in 1730 at the age of 21.  He was a bay son of the Darley Arabian and said to be out of a mare by the Byerley Turk, though his maternal lineage is questioned by some sources.

Bulle Rock is not mentioned in Britain's General Stud Book, which did not exist at the time of his birth, and, although the revised Volume 1 mentions some sons of the Darley Arabian, Bulle Rock is not among them, an omission possibly due to compiler James Weatherby having no knowledge of the dam. Pick's Turf Register references a Bullyrock, by the Darley Arabian, out of an "indifferent mare", which The Sportsman newspaper claims was "evidently the same horse" The name derives from sixteenth and seventeenth-century literature where it meant "boon companion". The term "my Bully Rooke" is used by Falstaff in Shakespeare's Merry Wives of Windsor.

Bulle Rock was foaled in England about 1709. Edgar's America Race-turf Register, Sportsman's Herald and General Stud Book of 1833 is credited with "preserving his fame" as other sources do not mention him until after this date. Edgar gives a birth date for Bulle Rock of 1718, a date repeated in the American Turf Register and Sporting Magazine of 1834, but given his race record occurred prior to that year, the 1709 date appears more credible. Later, Edgar seems to have conceded this error, requesting an amendment to the American Turf Register in 1835, concluding he must have been foaled "about the year 1707". Primary source information on the horse is scant. Contemporary advertisements could be found in old Virginia newspapers at one time, but by 1929, when Fairfax Harrison searched for them, these were lost.

During Bulle Rock's racing career in England, he was owned in part by the Earl of Huntingdon and part by Mr. Metcalfe.  His track career lasted six years, starting with the Ladies' Plate held at York in 1713, when he finished fourth, beaten by Careless.  The following year, he finished second in the same race and in 1715 was second in two races,  including the Royal Gold Cup at York, in which he was beaten by Brocklesby. He finally recorded a win in 1716, completing four heats of four miles each, winning two of them.  He recorded a third-place finish in 1717 and a second in 1718.

Bulle Rock was imported to America by a merchant mariner named James Patton, and owned by a Samuel Gist of Hanover County, Virginia Colony. Bulle Rock was thought to be an older horse by the time he arrived in America, but still was mated to at least 39 English or Spanish mares, and the fillies he got were in turn mated with other imported English stallions. His reputation was made by the descendants of one of his daughters, who was owned by the Belair Stud.

References

Sources

Thoroughbred racehorses